Harry George Barnes Jr. (June 5, 1926 – August 9, 2012) was an American diplomat, known for his role in ending the government of Chilean dictator Augusto Pinochet. A former Foreign Service Officer who served as US ambassador to Romania, India, and Chile, Barnes also occupied the post of Director General of the Foreign Service at the Department of State between December 22, 1977, and February 8, 1981. Elliott Abrams, the United States assistant secretary of state for inter-American affairs, once called Barnes "a world-class ambassador."

Early life
Harry George Barnes, Jr. was born in St. Paul, Minnesota, on June 5, 1926. He graduated from Amherst College, earned a Master's Degree in history from Columbia University, and served in the U.S. Army from 1944–46. Barnes entered the United States Foreign Service as consular officer in Bombay in 1951, and was head of the consular section in Prague in 1953–55. He was publications procurement officer in Moscow in 1957–59, leaving to become political officer in the Office of Soviet Affairs in the Department of State from 1959–62. He attended the National War College in 1962–63. In 1963–67, he was Deputy Chief of Mission in Kathmandu.

Diplomatic career
Barnes served as Deputy Chief of Mission in Bucharest in 1968–71, during which time he became the first American diplomat to address the Romanian nation on television. After returning to Washington he served as supervisory personnel officer (1971–72) and deputy executive secretary (1972–74) before being named Ambassador to Romania by Richard Nixon. During this time, Barnes' wife Elizabeth embarked on an affair with a Romanian embassy chauffeur. No security breach was detected and details of the affair were ordered classified by Secretary of State Cyrus R. Vance, leaking only in 1987 during Barnes' tenure in Chile.

Although the American government, in particular Henry Kissinger, had supported the rise of dictator Augusto Pinochet, by 1985 the Chilean opposition started to campaign against extending his rule. Barnes supported the ultimately successful effort, angering Pinochet, who called him "Dirty Harry". He advised the dictator that  ills of democracy can be cured only with more democracy." In addition to agitating for democratic reform, Barnes contributed oversight to the 1988 Chilean national plebiscite against extending Pinochet's rule, funding a parallel vote tally and advertising for the anti-Pinochet campaign.

Retirement
Barnes retired from government service in 1988.

Between 1994 and 2000, he served as the director of the Carter Center's Human Rights and Conflict Resolution Programs from 1994–2000. During this time, he traveled to North Korea and worked on Carter Center initiatives in this area. He also taught at several universities.

Barnes died on August 9, 2012, in Lebanon, New Hampshire. The cause of death was an infection.

References 

1926 births
2012 deaths
Ambassadors of the United States to Romania
Ambassadors of the United States to India
Ambassadors of the United States to Chile
People from Saint Paul, Minnesota
Amherst College alumni
Columbia Graduate School of Arts and Sciences alumni
United States Foreign Service personnel
Directors General of the United States Foreign Service